Anteros is an English indie pop band from London. The band formed in 2014, and is made up of Laura Hayden (vocals), Joshua Rumble (bass guitar), Jackson Couzens (guitar) and Harry Balazs (drums).

The band started off with Laura Hayden and Joshua Rumble who released their debut self-titled single - to today's lineup, which has seen the group hit the road on tour with Two Door Cinema Club, Blaenavon, and White Lies, as well as playing at Glastonbury and Reading & Leeds festivals.

In 2020, the band briefly appeared in Eurovision Song Contest: The Story of Fire Saga portraying The Wonderfour, Finland's representatives in the fictional edition of the Eurovision Song Contest depicted in the movie with the song Fool Moon.

Members 
 Laura Hayden - Vocals
 Joshua Rumble - Bass Guitar
 Jackson Couzens - Guitar
 Harry Balazs - Drums

Former members 
 Charles Monneraud - Guitar

Discography

Albums 
 When We Land (2019)

Extended plays 
 Anteros EP (2015)
 Breakfast EP (2016)
 Drunk EP (2017)

Singles 
 "Breakfast" (2016)
 "Blue" (2016)
 "The Beat" (2016)
 "Drunk" (2017)
 "Cherry Drop" (2017)
 "Bonnie" (2017)
 "Love" (2018)
 "Call Your Mother" (2018)

References

Musical groups from London
British indie pop groups
Musical groups established in 2014
2014 establishments in England